10 Rules is a 2014 romantic comedy film written and directed by Karel Janák and starring Miroslav Donutil, Matouš Ruml and Kristína Svarinská.

Plot 
With his most recent relationship having ended on Marek's (Matouš Ruml) anniversary, flatmate Marie (Tereza Nvotová) enlists the help of Marek's father (Miroslav Donutil) to teach his son the 10 rules of how to pick up a girl. Identifying the target as Stephanie (Kristína Svarinská), Marek's father, Marie plus other flatmates Erik and Pavel set into motion a plan to allow Marek to win the heart of Stephanie. Frustrating the plans, however, is love rival Filip, who seems to have a system of his own.

Cast 

Miroslav Donutil as Marek's father
Matouš Ruml as Marek
 as Filip
Kristína Svarinská as Stephanie
 as Erik
Tereza Nvotová as Marie
 as Pavel
Anna Šišková as Stephanie's mother

See also 
 List of Czech films of the 2010s

References

External links 

2014 romantic comedy films
Czech romantic comedy films
2010s Czech-language films